On 23 November 2014, a suicide bomber detonated his explosives at a volleyball match being held in the Yahyakhel District of Afghanistan's southeastern province Paktika. The explosion immediately killed at least 50 civilians and injured another 60. Many children were among the dead and wounded. By the next day, the death toll had climbed to 61.

Afghanistan's intelligence agency named the Haqqani network, which is closely aligned with the Taliban, as being behind the attack.

Reactions
 President Ashraf Ghani, who visited some of the wounded at a military hospital in Kabul, condemned attack as "inhumane and un-Islamic," saying "this kind of brutal killing of civilians cannot be justified."
  Nicholas Haysom, head of the UN Assistance Mission in Afghanistan (UNAMA), called the attack an "atrocity." A statement released by his spokesperson, Secretary-General Ban Ki-moon denounced the attack as "fundamentally abhorrent" and expressed his "steadfast solidarity with the people of Afghanistan in refusing to be cowed by such attacks."

References

2014 murders in Afghanistan
Terrorist incidents in Afghanistan in 2014
Suicide bombings in Afghanistan
Massacres in Afghanistan
Mass murder in 2014
Attacks in Afghanistan in 2014
History of Paktika Province
November 2014 crimes in Asia